Mill Street may refer to:

 Mill Street, Kent, a location in England
 Mill Street, Norfolk, a location in England
 Mill Street, Oxford, England
 Mill Street (Perth, Scotland)
 Mill Street (Perth, Western Australia)
 Mill Street, Suffolk, a location in England
 Millstreet, County Cork, Ireland
 Mill Street Brewery, Toronto, Canada
 Mill Street Stone Arch Bridge, Pine Hill, New York, US
 Newport Mill Street railway station, Wales

See also 
 Mill Street-North Clover Street Historic District, New York, USA
 South Ann Street-Mill Street Historic District, New York, USA
 Mill Lane (disambiguation)
 Mill Road (disambiguation)

Odonyms referring to a building